DXRA (783 AM) Radyo ni Juan is a radio station owned and operated by Rizal Memorial Colleges Broadcasting Corporation. It serves as the flagship station of the Radyo ni Juan network. The station's studio is located at Door 1C, Anda Corporate Center, F. Inigo St., Davao City, and its transmitter is located along Broadcast Ave., Shrine Hills, Matina, Davao City.

History
On August 27, 1987, DXRA was attacked by the New People's Army, in what became known as the DXRA Massacre, resulting in nine deaths.

In 2012, DXRA became part of the Radyo ni Juan network under the helm of the late broadcaster Dodong Solis.

References

Radio stations in Davao City
College radio stations in the Philippines
News and talk radio stations in the Philippines
Terrorism victims
Radio stations established in 1975